Magnolia vovidesii is a species of flowering plant in the family Magnoliaceae. It is native to the Sierra Madre Oriental of Veracruz state in eastern Mexico.

Description
Magnolia vovidesii is a tree growing from 15 to 25 metres tall. It mostly reproduces from suckers.

Distribution and habitat
Magnolia vovidesii is native to the Sierra Madre Oriental of Veracruz state, where it is known from three locations near Ixhuacan de los Reyes. The species has an estimated extent of occurrence (EOO) of 85 km2.

It grows in cloud forests, usually on steep slopes and in ravines, between 600 and 1,700 meters elevation. It typically grows in the understory of forests dominated by species of Weinmannia, Liquidambar, Styrax, and Ternstroemia.

Conservation
The species' conservation status is assessed as endangered. It is threatened by habitat degradation and fragmentation from timber and firewood harvesting and conversion to pasture, coffee plantations, and settlements. Over 70% of the tropical montane cloud forest in Veracruz has been converted to crops and livestock pasture.

Classification
The species was until recently classed as Magnolia dealbata.

References

vovidesii
Endemic flora of Mexico
Trees of Veracruz
Endangered biota of Mexico
Flora of the Sierra Madre Oriental
Cloud forest flora of Mexico
Plants described in 2013